Donald Leslie Langsford (born 7 May 1959) is a former Australian rules footballer who was highly successful in the West Australian Football League (WAFL) playing for the Swan Districts Football Club.

Langsford was initially recruited from the Scotch College, Perth and commenced his long WAFL career in 1977.
A noted defender, Langsford played mostly on the half back flank, but still managed to kick 60 career goals. He also played in four WAFL grandfinals.

Swan Districts entered a period of remarkable success in the early 1980s by winning a hat-trick of premierships in 1982, 1983 and 1984 with Langsford being an integral part of the team.
His best year was in 1983 when he was awarded the "Westside Football" Player of the Year award. In 1985-1986 he captained Swan Districts Football Club as well as the WA State Team and in his career played a total of 5 games for WA.

In 1987 Langsford was recruited as part of the West Coast Eagles inaugural team in the AFL, but only ever played in one Pre-Season game for the team.

John Todd rated Langsford as one of the seven best players he coached at Swan Districts. He is listed in the Swan Districts Team of the Century as an interchange player. Then in later 2008 was named in the Scotch College Football team of the century adding to his collection of great achievements.

References

External links
Don Langsford player profile page at WAFL FootyFacts

Swan Districts Football Club players
Australian rules footballers from Western Australia
1959 births
People from Esperance, Western Australia
Living people
People educated at Scotch College, Perth
Western Australian State of Origin players